The Almaz Shipbuilding Company is a Russian manufacturing enterprise, specializing in military and commercial ship design, development and production.

Headquartered in St. Petersburg, the factory has 165,000 square metres located in the central part of St. Petersburg on Petrovsky Island (near the Gulf of Finland). It was founded in 1901 for the production of motorboats. It has produced more than a thousand military and commercial ships.

On May 24, 2008 Leonid Grabovets was appointed as General Director for one year.

Production 
 Hovercraft
 Patrol boats
 High-speed motor boats

See also
 Lebed-class LCAC
 Aist-class LCAC

References

External links
 Official site of Almaz (www.almaz.spb.ru)
 Almaz Docks
 Almaz Shipbuilding Company at Rusnavy.com

Shipbuilding companies of Russia
Shipbuilding companies of the Soviet Union
Manufacturing companies based in Saint Petersburg
Vehicle manufacturing companies established in 1901
1901 establishments in the Russian Empire
Russian brands